The ČZ 2000 is a prototype 5.56 mm caliber Czech weapon system, consisting of a standard rifle, carbine and light machine gun. The system was developed in 1991 after adapting the LADA firearm prototype (chambered for the 5.45×39mm M74 cartridge  to the standard NATO 5.56×45mm round with the SS109 bullet.) J. Denel from the Brno-based Prototypa-ZM company is the chief designer for both systems. The ČZ 2000 (short for Česká zbrojovka, and the number 2000 signifies that this is a weapon system of the year 2000) was to be produced by Česká zbrojovka of Uherský Brod. It was planned to be the new service weapon of the Czech Army, replacing: the 7.62 mm vz. 58 assault rifle, 7.65 mm vz. 61 Škorpion submachine gun and 7.62 mm vz. 59 machine gun. As of 2007, the project has been discontinued.

Design details
The firearms of the ČZ 2000 series family fall under the category of automatic weapons - selective fire, gas-operated and locked with rotary bolt mechanism. Cartridge casings are extracted from the chamber with a spring-loaded claw extractor and ejected by a protrusion in the receiver housing.

The system uses a hammer-type striker and a trigger assembly equipped with a manual fire control selector (the fire selector lever is located at the left side of the receiver, just above the pistol grip), that enables semi-automatic fire (selector switch in the “1” setting), continuous fire (“30”) and three-round burst mode (“3”). The fire selector lever also operates the external safety mechanism (lever in the “0” position – weapon is safe). The rifle features an internal safety.

The ČZ 2000 family is fed from a curved box magazine molded from a translucent polymer material and has a 30-round cartridge capacity and an empty weight of 0.17 kg.

The ČZ 2000 series of weapons are equipped with a synthetic pistol grip, a side-folding metal wire stock (folds to the right side), adjustable iron sights (closed peep-type) with an aperture placed on a sliding drop arm that has the following range settings: from 100 to 800 m – in the carbine and standard rifle versions and from 100 to 1000 m – in the case of the light machine gun variant. Night-time operation of the weapon is enhanced through the use of three self-luminous aiming dots, two of which are located on extensions in the rear sight, and the third – at the base of the front sight post. The light machine gun variant features a standard side rail fastened to the left side of the receiver, used to mount optics, which can also be installed optionally on the carbine and rifle variants.

The ČZ 2000 system weapons share a high degree of parts commonality, and differ mainly with regards to barrel length and certain minor components, i.e. both the rifle and light machine gun are fitted with a slotted “birdcage” flash suppressor, whereas the carbine has a conical flash hider. Furthermore, the carbine features a shorter (than the rifle and LMG) piston operating rod, gas cylinder and handguard. The rifle and LMG can be fitted with a bipod (attached to the muzzle end of the barrel, folded under the barrel) and the rifle can also be used to mount a bayonet and underslung grenade launcher (the designers did not envision the need for launching rifle grenades).

The weapon was to be supplied with a standard set of magazines and accessories with 6 magazines, a magazine pouch, sling, sight adjustment tool, cleaning kit and segment cleaning rod.

See also
List of assault rifles

References

Notes

External links
Česká Zbrojovka (currently there's no CZ 2000 information)

5.45×39mm firearms
5.56×45mm NATO firearms
Assault rifles of Czechoslovakia
Squad automatic weapons
Trial and research firearms of Czechoslovakia
Kalashnikov derivatives